El Regreso (Spanish for The Return) is a 2013-2014 Chilean telenovela produced and broadcast by TVN.

Cast 
 Alejandra Fosalba as Fátima Massar
 Iván Álvarez de Araya as Diego Alcántara
 María José Illanes as Victoria Mondragón
 Felipe Contreras as Javier Rivas
 Mónica Carrasco as Rosa "Rosita" Moreno
 Teresita Reyes as Nina "Turca" Abdalha
 César Caillet as Néstor Bulnes
 Tamara Ferreira as Soo Hee
 Gabriel Cañas as Miguelo Abdalha
 Macarena Teke as Filomena "Filito" Gutiérrez
 Luis Kanashiro as Kim Myung
 Félix Villar as Wa Chong
 Sara Becker as Sofía Alcántara
 Luka Villalabeitía as Tomás Alcántara

Special participations 
 Nicole Pérez-Yarza as Claudia Larenas
 Catalina Silva as Loreto Williams
 Otilio Castro as El Jeque
 Felipe Gómez Badilla as Rocco

See also
 Televisión Nacional de Chile

References

External links
 Official website 

2013 telenovelas
2013 Chilean television series debuts
2014 Chilean television series endings
Chilean telenovelas
Spanish-language telenovelas
Televisión Nacional de Chile telenovelas